The 2020 Bretagne Classic Ouest–France was a road cycling one-day race that took place on 25 August 2020 in France. It was the 84th edition of Bretagne Classic Ouest–France and the 11th event of the 2020 UCI World Tour.

Teams
Twenty-five teams, including all 19 UCI WorldTour teams and six UCI Professional Continental teams, were scheduled to participate in the race. On the morning of the race, an unnamed  rider tested positive for COVID-19, so the entire team decided to pull out of the race. This meant that 166 riders started the race, of which 104 finished. After the race, Ralph Denk the team boss of Bora–Hansgrohe, raised concerns about the COVID-19 test, after it returned a false positive.

UCI WorldTeams

 
 
 
 
 
 
 
 
 
 
 
 
 
 
 
 
 
 

UCI Professional Continental teams

Results

References

Bretagne Classic Ouest–France
Bretagne Classic Ouest–France
Bretagne Classic Ouest–France
Bretagne Classic